Geoffrey James Dear, Baron Dear,  (born 20 September 1937) is a crossbench peer and retired British police officer who is a former Chief Constable of West Midlands Police. He was described by the broadcaster and writer Sir Robin Day as "the best known and most respected police officer of his generation".

Police career 

He was born to Cecil William Dear and Violet Mackney, and educated at Fletton Grammar School in Old Fletton, Huntingdonshire. He joined Peterborough Combined Police (which became part of Mid-Anglia Constabulary in 1965) as a Cadet and became a Constable in 1956. In 1965 he went to University College, London, on a Bramshill Scholarship to study law. 

Graduating in 1968 and then serving as divisional commander in Cambridge, he was appointed Assistant Chief Constable (Operations) of Nottinghamshire Combined Constabulary (Nottinghamshire Police from 1974) in 1972. From 1975 to 1977, he was seconded to Bramshill Police College as Director of Command Training. 

In September 1979, he was awarded the Queen's Commendation for Brave Conduct for his arrest of an armed and "mentally deranged" man who had barricaded himself in a house with his infant son after a multiple shooting incident.

In 1980 he transferred to the Metropolitan Police as Deputy Assistant Commissioner (Training). In this role he came to public attention as he instituted racial awareness training for police officers in the wake of the Brixton riots, into which he also conducted an internal investigation. On 1 December 1981 he was appointed Assistant Commissioner "D" (Personnel and Training). 

He was awarded the Queen's Police Medal (QPM) in 1982 in recognition of his involvement post-riots in Brixton in 1981, in always difficult and sometimes dangerous circumstances, and headed the Met's investigation into the shooting of Steven Waldorf in 1983. In 1984, he moved to become Assistant Commissioner "A" (Operations and Administration). In 1985, he left the Metropolitan Police to become Chief Constable of West Midlands Police. He was the last officer to hold the post of Assistant Commissioner "A" before it was abolished in the reorganisation later that year.

In the West Midlands, he quickly came to the fore with his handling of the aftermath of the shooting by police of a young boy and, separately, the aftermath of the 1985 Handsworth riots. He instituted wide-ranging changes in that force, both administratively and operationally. In 1989, he headed the investigation into the Hillsborough Stadium Disaster. He was widely expected to be appointed Chief Constable of the Royal Ulster Constabulary in 1989, but the job went instead to Hugh Annesley.

Dear was Chief Constable during the last years of the West Midlands Serious Crime Squad, as its malpractices and unsafe convictions came to light. It was shut down in 1989. The squad was investigated by the West Yorkshire Police, who found evidence of serious abuses but not enough to prosecute individual officers. A number of officers retired early or departed preventing internal disciplinary proceedings. Since the squad was shut down, over 60 convictions have been found to be unsafe and quashed.

He served as Chief Constable of the West Midlands until 1 April 1990, when he was appointed one of HM Inspectors of Constabulary. The decision was criticised by the MP Chris Mullin, given Dear's ultimate responsibility for the continuing failures of the West Midlands Serious Crime Squad.

He was knighted in the 1997 New Year Honours, shortly before his retirement.

He was a member of the Glidewell review into the Crown Prosecution Service from 1997 to 1998 and advised the Auld Review of the Criminal Courts process in 2002 and the Virdi Enquiry in 2003.

Peerage 

Dear was created a life peer as Baron Dear, of Willersey in the County of Gloucestershire, on 2 May 2006.

He has held a number of remunerated positions as non-executive director or chairman, and is currently non-executive chairman of Blaythorne Group Ltd.

He was appointed a Deputy Speaker and a Deputy Chairman of Committees in 2015, and was a member of the European Union Select Committee, 2011–2015, the Home Affairs Sub-Committee, 2008–2012, and the Economic and Financial Affairs Sub-Committee, 2011–2015. Since 2015 he has been a member of the Privileges and Conduct Committee and the Works of Art Committee. In 2008 he successfully led opposition in the House of Lords to defeat the Government's intention to extend from 28 to 42 days the length of time that suspected terrorists could be held without charge. In 2012 he successfully amended the Public Order Act 1986 so as to protect freedom of speech in public, and similarly defeated Government attempts in 2014 to lower the threshold test for the creatation of ASBOs from conduct likely to cause "harassment, alarm or distress" to "nuisance or annoyance".

Criticising the absence of prior governmental consultation concerning the bill, he was a prominent opponent in the Lords to the Government's legislation to introduce same-sex marriage, proposing a "wrecking amendment" to the bill, which was defeated. He spoke of fear of "such opposition to homosexuals in general that the climate of tolerance and acceptance in this country that we have all championed ... could well be set back by decades". He asked for a commission to "call on the very best minds from the fields of theology, philosophy, sociology, jurisprudence and finance", despite the risk of taking up "valuable parliamentary time" ... "when so many other pressing matters demand our attention." Some of his points were addressed in summing-up.

He is Deputy Lieutenant of Worcestershire, was Vice-Lord Lieutenant of that county from 1998 to 2001, and is an Honorary Bencher of Gray's Inn. He is a Fellow of University College, London and an Honorary Fellow of Birmingham City University

Personal life 

Dear married Judith Stocker in 1958. After the death of his first wife in 1996, he married Alison Jones two years later. He has two daughters and a son by his first marriage.

Arms

Footnotes

References

Biography, Who's Who

1937 births
Assistant Commissioners of Police of the Metropolis
Living people
People's peers
Crossbench life peers
Knights Bachelor
Metropolitan Police recipients of the Queen's Police Medal
Deputy Lieutenants of Worcestershire
Deputy Lieutenants of the West Midlands (county)
Alumni of University College London
People from Huntingdonshire
Chief Constables of West Midlands Police
Recipients of the Queen's Commendation for Brave Conduct
Life peers created by Elizabeth II